West Karawang is a district of Karawang Regency which serves as its administrative center. The district was established in 2003 as a result of Karawang Regency's new regulation regarding its administrative divisions. It is divided into 8 villages which are as follows:

Karangpawitan
Mekarjati
Nagasari
Tanjungmekar (location of district HQ)
Tanjungpura
Tunggakjati
West Adiarsa
West Karawang

Climate
Karawang has a tropical monsoon climate (Am) with moderate to little rainfall from May to October and heavy rainfall from November to April.

See also 
 San Diego Hills, a cemetery in West Karawang

References 

Karawang Regency
Populated places in West Java
Regency seats of Indonesia